Leinburg is a municipality in the district of Nürnberger Land in Bavaria in Germany.

References

Nürnberger Land